East Valenzuela station is an under-construction Metro Manila Subway station located along Mindanao Avenue, Valenzuela, Metro Manila. It will be the northern terminus of the line.

References

 Rail transportation in the Philippines

Transportation in Manila